Lynnfield is a station stop on the RTA Blue Line in Shaker Heights, Ohio, located at the intersection of Lynnfield Road, Parkland Drive, Norwood Road and Van Aken Boulevard.

History

The station opened on April 11, 1920, with the initiation of rail service by the Cleveland Interurban Railroad on what is now Van Aken Boulevard from here to Shaker Square and then to East 34th Street and via surface streets to downtown. At the time, Lynnfield was the end of the line. In 1923 the station building was built at a cost of $17,926 to provide a waiting room for passengers. It also housed tobacco and newspaper stands. The newspapers were delivered to the station by rapid transit. The building included outside shelters on both sides.

After the line was extended to Warrensville Center Road in 1930, Lynnfield no longer functioned as the end of the line and the station building was not needed. The building was leased to a series of tenants.

In 1980 and 1981, the Green and Blue Lines were completely renovated with new track, ballast, poles and wiring, and new stations were built along the line. The renovated line along Van Aken Boulevard opened on October 30, 1981. The improvements at Lynnfield included renovating the original station building, providing benches in the waiting shelter, and enclosing the waiting shelter in glass.

Station layout

The station comprises two side platforms east of the intersection, with a large station building an attached sheltered waiting area on the westbound platform. There are parking spaces along the median of Van Aken Boulevard on both sides just east of the platforms.

References

External links

Blue Line (RTA Rapid Transit)
Railway stations in the United States opened in 1920
1920 establishments in Ohio